Birt Acres (23 July 1854 – 27 December 1918) was an American and British photographer and film pioneer. Among his contributions to the early film industry are the first working 35 mm camera in Britain (Wales), and Birtac, the first daylight loading home movie camera and projector. He also directed a number of early silent films.

Early life
Born in Richmond, Virginia, on 23 July 1854, to English parents. He became an orphan at the age of 14, during the American Civil War and was raised by an aunt.

Career
Acres invented the first British 35 mm moving picture camera, Birtac which was the first daylight loading home movie camera and projector; he was also the first travelling newsreel reporter in international film history and the first European film maker who had his films shown in the United States in public performances. He contributed much to the introduction and development of cinematography in all its aspects, from the construction of cameras, projectors, film viewers, coating and slitting machines and the manufacture of highly sensitized 35 mm raw film stock, to mobile newsreel reporting and the public projections of moving pictures.

With his partner Robert W. Paul, he was the first person to build and run a working 35 mm camera in Britain. Incident at Clovelly Cottage was made in March 1895 and featured Acres' wife with their infant son in a pram outside Acres' then home of Clovelly Cottage, Park Road, Chipping Barnet, which still exists. Acres and Paul fell out after Acres patented their design in his own name on 27 May 1895. He made some very early silent films during the Victorian era including in 1895: a film of the Oxford and Cambridge Boat Race, The Arrest of a Pickpocket, The Comic Shoeblack, The Boxing Kangaroo and Performing Bears.

On 10 January 1896, he gave a display of moving pictures to the Lyonsdown Photographic Society at the Lytton Road Assembly Rooms in New Barnet. This was the first public film show to an audience in the United Kingdom.

Acres was a Fellow of the Royal Photographic Society. On 14 January 1896, he demonstrated his Kineopticon system to members and wives of the Society, at the Queen's Hall in London. Robert Paul's first solo theatrical programme was at the Alhambra Theatre on 25 March 1896.

Acres is buried in Walthamstow, London.

Most important achievements
 1889 Apparatus for washing prints (patented).
 1891 Printing process for stereoscopic photographs (for continuously contact print making) (patented).
 1893 Hopper feed installation for rapidly projecting slides in a biunial (two-in-one) lantern to create the illusion of movement (patented).
 1895 Kinetic Camera with appliance for loop forming (patented).
 1895/96 Electroscope, apparatus for continuous viewing by more than one spectator of 35mm film.
 1896 Installation for wholesale production of raw stock 35 mm film.
 1896 Kineopticon, improved apparatus for projecting 35 mm film (patented).
 1897 Cine camera with 2 lenses to resolve flicker problems and to enhance brightness.
 1898 Birtac, home movie camera for daylight loading of 17.5 mm film (patented).

Filmography

References

External links

 Birt Acres biography and credits at BFI Screenonline
 Birt Acres at earlycinema.com
 An 1896 Fairground Programme on the Europa Film Treasures site

American people of English descent
American cinematographers
British cinematographers
Cinema pioneers
Artists from Richmond, Virginia
1854 births
1918 deaths
American emigrants to England